Ellis Abraham Franklin (5 October 1822 – 11 May 1909) was a British merchant banker.

Early life
Franklin was the son of Abraham Franklin (1784–1854), a silversmith and licensed navy agent, who started in Portsmouth, then later moved to Liverpool and eventually Manchester. He came from a prominent Anglo-Jewish family, originally Fraenkel, that arrived in England from Breslau in the 18th century.

Career
He was born in Liverpool and educated at Manchester Grammar School. He joined the merchant bank that had been established by Samuel Montagu, married Montagu's sister (Adelaide), and became a partner in 1862.

Personal life
His son, Arthur Ellis Franklin (1857–1938), was a British merchant banker and senior partner of A. Keyser & Co. 

His other son, Sir Leonard Benjamin Franklin (1862–1944), was a barrister, banker and Liberal Party politician. His daughter, Beatrice Franklin, married Herbert Samuel, 1st Viscount Samuel, the Liberal politician who was party leader from 1931-35.

Death
Franklin died in 1909.

References

1822 births
1909 deaths
English bankers
English Jews
Ellis Abraham
19th-century English businesspeople